Sadaka is a genus of cicadas from West Africa.

Species
These six species belong to the genus Sadaka:
 Sadaka aurovirens Dlabola, 1960 c g
 Sadaka dimidiata (Karsch, 1893) c g
 Sadaka morini Boulard, 1985 c g
 Sadaka radiata (Karsch, 1890) c g
 Sadaka sagittifera Boulard, 1985 c g
 Sadaka virescens (Karsch, 1890) c g
Data sources: i = ITIS, c = Catalogue of Life, g = GBIF, b = Bugguide.net

References

Insects of West Africa
Taxa named by William Lucas Distant
Cicadidae genera
Platypleurini